The Communauté de communes du Val Bréon is a former federation of municipalities (communauté de communes) in the Seine-et-Marne département and in the Île-de-France région of France. It was created in January 1995. It was merged into the new Communauté de communes du Val Briard in January 2017.

Composition 
The Communauté de communes comprised the following communes:

Les Chapelles-Bourbon
Châtres
Crèvecœur-en-Brie
Fontenay-Trésigny
La Houssaye-en-Brie
Liverdy-en-Brie
Marles-en-Brie
Mortcerf
Neufmoutiers-en-Brie
Presles-en-Brie

See also
Communes of the Seine-et-Marne department

References 

Former commune communities of Seine-et-Marne